The 2005-06 Shere Bangla National Football Championship was the 5th season of the annual domestic national club football tournament hosted by the Bangladesh Football Federation. A total of 52 participants including 5 services teams across the country competed for the tournament.

Dhaka Mohammedan is the current champions.
The club have beaten Dhaka Abahani 2-0 on 8 January 2016 at Dhaka.

Overview
Mohammedan SC won the championship.

First stage

Super Six Round

Semi-finals

Final

References

External links
RSSSF

 
1
1